Saw Delight is the eighth studio album by the German rock band Can, and features two new band members who were ex-members of the band Traffic, Rosko Gee and Rebop Kwaku Baah, with Can's bassist Holger Czukay giving up the bass in favour of experimental effects.

It was made as a binaural recording.

Track listing

Personnel
Can
Holger Czukay – wave receiver, spec. sounds, vocals on 1
Michael Karoli – guitar, electric violin, vocals on 1, 5
Jaki Liebezeit – drums, vocals on 1
Irmin Schmidt – keyboard, Alpha 77, vocals on 1
Rosko Gee – bass, vocals on 1, 3
Rebop Kwaku Baah – percussion, vocals on 1

References

External links 

 

1977 albums
Can (band) albums
Mute Records albums
Worldbeat albums
Binaural recordings